Chonyi (Conyi, Kichonyi, Chichonyi) is a Bantu language spoken along the eastern coast of Kenya in Kilifi County by the Chonyi people. It is part of the Mijikenda dialect cluster.

In 2019, there were an estimated  speakers. Of these,  spoke the Jibana dialect (Chidzihana) and  the Kauma dialect (Chikauma).

References 

Bantu languages
Languages of Kenya
Mijikenda